The following is a list of churches in Luton, a unitary authority in Bedfordshire, England.

Active churches 
The borough has an estimated 117 churches for 216,800 inhabitants, a ratio of one church to every 1,853 people. This is a higher density than many other recently built urban areas due to the high number of Pentecostal churches in the town (an estimated 52 churches, nearly half of the total number).

Notes

References 

Luton
Churches
 
Churches